Dean Gordons (born 4 November 1959) is a sailor from Australia, who represented his country at the 1984 Summer Olympics in Los Angeles, United States as crew member in the Soling. With helmsman Gary Sheard and fellow crew member Tim Dorning they took the 7th place.

References

Living people
1959 births
Sailors at the 1984 Summer Olympics – Soling
Olympic sailors of Australia
Australian male sailors (sport)
20th-century Australian people